Djamaâ District is a district of El M'Ghair Province, Algeria. As of the 2008 census, it has a population of 89,880.

Communes

Djamaâ District consists of four communes:
Djamaa
M'Rara
Sidi Amrane
Tendla

References

Districts of El M'Ghair Province